Donya Salomon-Ali (born 22 February 1993) is a Canadian-born Haitian footballer who plays as a defender for the Haiti women's national team.

Early life
Salomon-Ali was born to a Haitian mother and an Iraqi father.

Club career
In August 2017, Salomon-Ali joined Greek club AO Trikala 2011.

International goals
Scores and results list Haiti's goal tally first

References

1993 births
Living people
Citizens of Haiti through descent
Haitian women's footballers
Women's association football defenders
Louisiana Tech Lady Techsters soccer players
Haiti women's international footballers
Haitian people of Iraqi descent
Haitian expatriate footballers
Haitian expatriate sportspeople in the United States
Expatriate women's soccer players in the United States
Haitian expatriate sportspeople in Greece
Expatriate women's footballers in Greece
People from LaSalle, Quebec
Soccer players from Montreal
Canadian women's soccer players
Université de Moncton alumni
Black Canadian women's soccer players
Canadian sportspeople of Haitian descent
Canadian people of Iraqi descent
Francophone Quebec people
Canadian expatriate women's soccer players
Canadian expatriate sportspeople in the United States
Canadian expatriate sportspeople in Greece